Abramovo is a rural locality (a village) in Denyatinskoye Rural Settlement of Melenkovsky_District, Vladimir Oblast, Russia. The population was 1 as of 2010. There are 2 streets.

Geography 
Abramovo is located 33 km north of Melenki (the district's administrative centre) by road. Novo-Barsukovo is the nearest rural locality.

References 

Rural localities in Melenkovsky District